Hildur Þorgeirsdóttir (born 11 March 1989) is an Icelandic handball player for Fram and the Icelandic national team.

Career
Hildur signed with Fram in May 2015 after playing the previous four seasons in Germany. She won the Icelandic championship with Fram in 2017.

References

1989 births
Living people
Hildur Thorgeirsdottir
Hildur Thorgeirsdottir